Frenk is a surname. Notable people with the surname include:

Carlos Frenk (born 1951), Mexican-British cosmologist
Julio Frenk (born 1953), Mexican physician and former Secretary of Health of Mexico
Mariana Frenk-Westheim (1898–2004), writer, hispanist, lecturer of literature, museum expert and Mexican translator
Navarro-Frenk-White profile, spatial distribution of dark matter predicted from N-body simulations,
Frenk Ibrahim Pasha (1493–1536), Ottoman grand vizier